Canoe Creek Township is located in Rock Island County, Illinois. As of the 2010 census, its population was 711 and it contained 317 housing units.

Geography 

Demographics

References

External links 
City-data.com
Illinois State Archives

Townships in Rock Island County, Illinois
Townships in Illinois